is a Japanese manga series written and illustrated by Tooru Fujisawa, the creator of Great Teacher Onizuka. It was serialized in Kodansha's Afternoon in 2003 and collected into 3 tankōbon volumes.

An anime television series adaptation animated by AIC Spirits and Group TAC first aired in Japan on April 15, 2006 and ran for 13 episodes. The manga was licensed in North America by Tokyopop, who released the first volume on July 15, 2008. The anime was licensed in the United States and United Kingdom by Manga Entertainment, with its first DVD released on March 20, 2007, and in Australasia by Madman Entertainment. In the US, Sci Fi (now Syfy) aired Tokko in 2007, in 2010 it aired on Chiller.

Synopsis
Officially known to the general public as Special Mobile Investigation Forces Section 2; Special Public Safety Task Force, or Tokko under the supervision of the Public Security Intelligence Agency after the Special Mobile Investigation Troops relinquished, with some of its members recruited from the police force. It was established after the Machida massacre was secretly investigated to discover that the perpetrators were demons, called Phantoms, from the netherworld, able to cross into reality when the "Box of Dirge" (or "Druj", as the DVD English subtitles say) was broken, with each of the 108 pieces being taken by a powerful Phantom. Under the command of Superintendent Ryoko Ibuki, she recruited members, who, as survivors of the Machida massacre, have Phantoms inside them that when "awakened", grant the superhuman speed and the ability to materialize swords. They use swords to dispatch the Phantoms and their lesser human faced larva parasites, that come into the world through the giant holes caused by unnatural earthquakes in Japan's Kanto region, since most firearms do not incapacitate or kill them. Their actions have come under harsh criticism from other officers for conducting their operations in secretive manners and for covering up the deaths of either civilians or police officers, informing the public via news releases that deaths or injuries caused by demons were done by armed or insane criminals.

All members of Section 2 bear a tattoo (except for Ibuki who is not a symbiont). This is their "symbiont tattoo", which marks them as carriers of a "phantom", one of the 108 demons. Not all of the symbionts are with Section 2. A symbiont may be good or evil, but the spirit's alignment is unknown until it is awakened within the host. This phantom also imparts a type of protection, for example allowing Sakura to walk away unscathed from a car accident as a child. Only symbionts have the strength, speed and endurance to kill the demons with bladed weapons. Using the symbionts, Section 2 hunts down the other Phantoms, dismembering them to get the 108 fragments to close the Machida hole before it expands and covers the entire world.

Plot
In 2011, a young man named Ranmaru Shindo lives in Tokyo with his younger sister, Saya. They moved from Machida 5 years earlier, after the massacre of their parents in their apartment complex, which was attacked and overrun by unknown assailants who ruthlessly and brutally killed almost everyone in several buildings in the complex. He has been having recurring dreams for some time, of a tattooed girl covered in blood holding a giant sword surrounded by bodies, but they are now growing more frequent. It is the day his class graduates to become investigators for The Special Mobile Investigation Forces, or Tokki, which he joined to learn about his parents' death. Later on the day of his graduation, he sees the girl from his dream wearing a police uniform. She is Sakura Rokujo, who is in the same class as him and a member of Section 2, known officially as Special Public Safety Task Force, or Tokko. Its other main members include the young prodigy Kureha Suzuka, the silent strongman Takeru Inukai and its leader Ryoko Ibuki. There are many rumors about Tokko, one of which is that they use swords to execute criminals and that body parts are often found at the crime scenes Tokko investigates. There are also rumors that they aren't even human.

When Ranmaru's unit investigates another grizzly murder, a witness claims to see a demon, which was also rumored at other bloody scenes. There they encounter humans with talking human faced larva parasites growing out of them, that are impervious to guns. The demons refer to Ranmaru as having the scent of Michida and attack, before he is saved by Sakura and Tokko. She explains that they were just lesser monsters controlled to target survivors of the Michida incident. Afterwards, Ranmaru's team researches previous violent dismemberments and learns that most have witnesses claiming to see demons and that the incidents have been on the rise since Michida. Sakura soon after reveals to Ranmaru that the Machida incident was caused by the monsters, which are demons from the otherworld. Five days before the incident, a box created by ancient philosophers and alchemists was opened that connects to the otherworld, the demons that came through committed the massacre. The stronger demons are called Phantoms and grow stronger by eating humans, these are the ones Tokko are tasked with finding and killing. The holes created by the earthquakes are the gates that allow them to enter the world. It is also confirmed that the main members of Tokko aren't fully human, referring to themselves as hunters.

Ranmaru and his best friend and partner Hanazono sneak into the closed off Machida crime scene to inspect the hole. When Ranmaru disturbs the hole by dropping something in it, a demon comes out an attacks them. Tokko arrives and saves them, and explains they are all survivors of Machida and the only ones that can defeat them as they have "awakened" into symbionts, having Phantoms inside them that protected them during the incident. The Machida hole is getting bigger and in two years will swallow Tokyo. The box that opened the gate was broken into 108 pieces, each of which is inside a Phantom, and Tokko collects the pieces in order to close the gate. The 12th Phantom, the one controlling the human faced larva parasites, then appears. Ranmaru asks Kureha Suzuka to show him how to awaken so he can fight, even after she warns him that he might not remain himself in which case they would have to kill him. To do so she mortally wounds him and throws him into the hole. When he emerges he completes the symbiosis with a giant demon, forming his tattoos and granting him two large swords, and defeats the Phantom in one attack. When he wakes up a week later, he is transferred to Tokko. In the epilogue it is hinted that two years later the hole did in fact swallow Tokyo.

The story then focuses on Itsuto Araragi and his sister Mayu in 2011, who are survivors of Michida and symbiont hunters unaffiliated with Tokko. Together they hunt Phantoms and eat them to get stronger, absorbing their abilities, aiming to eventually kill them all. They accidentally save Yukino Shiraishi from committing suicide and deduce she was being controlled by a Phantom. They learn students have been going missing at her university and that there are rumors of "demons". There they encounter many Phantoms, learning that some humans willing become them. It is revealed this all started when Yukino discovered what she thought to be a mummy hand and took it back the university, it was in fact a Phantom hand from Machida. Her father, who works at the university, began experimenting and learned humans can become a hybrid of human and phantom by eating them and began to turn the students as well. He was the one who planted a larva in Yukino to make her commit suicide, after she saw him kill her mother. Using their newly absorbed abilities from the Phantoms at the school, Itsuto and Mayu defeat her father, with her finishes him off herself by setting their house on fire. Yukino then moves in with Itsuto and Mayu, saying she wants to learn more about the demons to prevent this from happening again.

Characters

Ranmaru Shindo

 One of the survivors of the Machida massacre alongside his young sister Saya, he joined the police force to find out who was responsible for murdering his parents. An officer in the Shibuya precinct as a detective in the Tokki division, he finds out during his work that demons from the other realm are responsible for orchestrating various massacres. Later on, he joins the Tokko division so as to save the country from being overrun by the demons. He suffers from Post-traumatic stress disorder due to the massacre and the deaths of his parents when he and his sister were still in kids. Since he survived the Machida incident, all Phantom demons were given instruction to finish him off, as well as any other witnesses who have seen the events. As he and Saya were the only survivors of the Shindo family, the two became very close after they were tragically orphaned. His symbiont tattoos are on his right forearm and left shoulder.

Saya Shindo

 Younger sister of Ranmaru, she joined the police force as a uniformed patrol officer. As a survivor of the Machida massacre, she also has a phantom inside her, though it is never awakened. Unlike her brother, she does not experience post-traumatic stress disorder as she opts to forget the memories of the events in Machida. Like her brother, she gets targeted for assassination by the Phantom demons, as she was one of the survivors of the murders. When not in police work or in danger from being assassinated by the Phantoms, she nags Ranmaru like a mother, such as telling him to finish his food or go have himself checked up for any injuries. She cares deeply about him and will do everything that she can to make sure that he is okay.

Sakura Rokujo

 One of the survivors of the Machida massacre, she was the woman haunting Ranmaru's dreams of his parents and neighbors being killed by a Phantom demon. Working in the Tokko division in the Shibuya precinct, the 18-year-old handles a broadsword in dispatching the Phantoms. Her tattoos are on her right shoulder and arm, a dragon, and left arm. Her brother was also a survivor but has been unconscious since then, she resolves to kill all the monsters.
 
 In the anime, it is also hinted that she may have feelings for Ranmaru when she kissed him before she went into his psyche in order to help save him from being possessed. Later on in the anime, she is forced to face her own brother when the symbionts inside of him possess him and turn him into evil. In the final episode Ranmaru stabs her with his sword (and kisses her) to gain her shard, hinting that she dies, however at the end of the episode she is seen laying in a hospital bed apparently in a coma. She then wakes up and we hear evil laughter (not Sakura's).

Kureha Suzuka

 A young prodigy who joined the police force at the age of 18 with the rank of Assistant Inspector, she is posted in the Tokko division.

 Her preferred weapons are two daggers that have four retractable blades. Kureha does not wear a shirt with the Tokko division's black leather jacket and pants, revealing a tattoo of a butterfly above her pierced belly-button. In the anime, she originally had brown hair, before changing it to blonde after the massacre as a means of moving on after her parents were killed by Phantoms and the death of her younger brother, Akito, at her hands. Her symbiont tattoo, never shown in the manga, was on her right shoulder in the anime.

Takeru Inukai

 The only male main member of Tokko, he survived the Machida incident by tearing apart his parents' killers with his bare hands. He is usually silent and dresses in black clothing and wears black shades. In the anime, he was recruited by Ryoko after demons kidnapped his sister and had been a martial artist (implied to be kendo) before joining the police. He is later killed by Sakura's possessed brother back in the ruins of the Machida apartment in episode eleven.

Ryoko Ibuki

 Commanding officer of the Tokko division with the rank of Superintendent, she is responsible for the Tokko's operations in conducting anti-Phantom operations in Tokyo. She prefers guns over other weapons and is never actually confirmed to be a symbiont in the manga; in the anime she is explicitly said to be a normal human.

Kaoru Kunikida

 Chief Inspector of the Shibuya branch of Tokki, where Ranmaru and Hanazono are assigned. He hates the Tokko division and its members for being so secretive, especially when his fellow officers were murdered by the Phantoms and its human-controlled slaves via Human Face larvae. He is insistent in finding out the reasons why Tokko exists and its agenda, to the cost of possibly losing his job over this. He is especially infuriated when Ranmaru leaves his division for Tokko. In the anime, he appears to have a daughter named Ruru (most likely a nickname) and is also a womanizer.

 Based on various side remarks on Kaoru during certain events in the series, it is apparent that he might have been a gangster in his youth before he decided to reform himself as a police officer. His rough behavior and language also fit the general stereotype of a yakuza.

Ichiro Hanazono

 Ranmaru's best friend and partner. They graduated together and are assigned to the same commander. They can be troublemakers when together. Ichiro often calls Ranmaru a pervert and says that he has something for his younger sister. In actuality Hanazono has a crush on Saya and often gets mad at Ranmaru for always being around attractive women, stating that he used to think Ranmaru was loser.

Itsuto Araragi
 He and his sister Maya are hunters unaffiliated with Tokko. A survivor from Machida, he "awakened" when he and Maya walked in on their parents being eaten by phantoms. Together they hunt phantoms and eat them to get stronger, absorbing their abilities, and aim to eventually kill them all.

Mayu Araragi
 She and her older brother Itsuto are hunters unaffiliated with Tokko. As survivor from Machida, they hunt phantoms together and eat them to get stronger by absorbing their abilities, aiming to eventually kill them all. She is adept at detecting phantoms and can insert any image she wants into someone else's mind, a sort of hallucination, although she can physically hold her own.

Yukino Shiraishi

 She is accidentally saved from committing suicide by Itsuko and Mayu. After deducing she was being controlled by a phantom, the two learn students have been going missing at the university she works at and that there are rumors of "demons". It all started when Yukino discovered and took back the university what was in fact a Phantom hand from Machida. Her father began experimenting and learned humans can become a hybrid of human and phantom by eating them and began to turn the students as well, with some willingly agreeing. He planted a larva in Yukino to make her commit suicide when she walked in on him trying to force her mother to eat phantom and killed her when she refused.

 In the anime her character is different, she is often referred to as the "hottie from the crime lab" by Ranmaru's colleagues. Her mother died prior to the Machida incident, with her father becoming obsessed with his research soon after. Saya set her and Ranmaru up on a blind date that ended up in them finding out more about the phantoms. Later on, on a second date they were attacked by Yukino's father after he turned himself into a phantom/human hybrid. Leaving her job awhile after, Yukino gives Ranmaru the info behind the murderer of her mother who caused the Machida incident.

Mikae

 She is Saya's colleague whom Saya tries to pair up with Ranmaru. In the anime, she later develops a crush on him.

Ogata
 An anime only character, having the rank of Councilor, he is the main link of Tokko and the government in battling the Phantom demons.

Media

Manga
Written and illustrated by Tooru Fujisawa, Tokko was serialized in Kodansha's Afternoon in 2003 and collected into 3 tankōbon volumes from February 25, 2004 to April 25, 2004. The third volume, titled Phantom Hunter, is a side story detailing two siblings (male and female), who happen to be survivors of the Machida massacre.

The manga was licensed and released in North America by Tokyopop, releasing the three volumes from July 15, 2008 to February 3, 2009. It was also licensed in other countries, such as in France by Pika Édition, in Hong Kong by Jonesky, in South Korea by Haksan Publishing, and in Taiwan by Tong Li Publishing.

Anime
A 13-episode anime television series adaptation was broadcast on Wowow from April 15, 2006 to July 29, 2006. Japanese DVDs have been released starting on August 24, September 21 with an additional release on November 23, 2006. The anime's opening theme is "Nothing" and the ending theme is "Sherry", both by dB. The Tokko Original Soundtrack was released on June 28, 2006 in stores around Japan with some making its way through Amazon North America and Europe in the subsequent months. It includes eleven tracks without the opening and closing themes from the anime.

The anime was licensed in the United States and United Kingdom by Manga Entertainment, and in Australasia by Madman Entertainment. It was broadcast in the U.S. on the Sci Fi Channel (now Syfy) as part of its Ani-Monday block of anime programming from June 18 to September 24, 2007 at 11:30 p.m. EST. Chiller, another NBC Universal network, began airing the series at 2:00 AM, ET on Monday, June 14, 2010 (11:00 PM, PT, Sunday, June 13, 2010). Episodes 1-4 were aired in order, followed by a repeat of the same episodes immediately afterward.  Episodes 5-8 aired on Monday, June 21, 2010 at the same times the first four episodes aired.  Episodes 9-13 aired on Monday, June 28, 2010.

Episodes

Radio drama
A radio drama had taken place on October 11, 2006. It had briefly expanded a bit on the events after the anime had ended.

References

External links
WOWOW's site for the anime 
Manga UK's site for the anime

2003 manga
2006 Japanese television series debuts
2006 Japanese television series endings
Action anime and manga
Anime International Company
Demons in anime and manga
Group TAC
Horror anime and manga
Kodansha manga
Police in anime and manga
Seinen manga
Shogakukan manga
Supernatural anime and manga
Tokyopop titles
Tooru Fujisawa
Wowow original programming
Zombies in anime and manga